Superwoman is the fourth studio album by English singer-songwriter Rebecca Ferguson, released on 14 October 2016 via Syco and Sony Music Entertainment. Prior to the announcement of the album, Ferguson had reportedly been working with producers such as Mark Ronson, Jonny Lattimer and Troy Miller. She embarked on the Superwoman Tour to promote the album, which began at Venue Cymru in Llandudno on the 23 October 2016.

Singles
The lead single, "Bones", premiered on the Ken Bruce BBC Radio Two show on 1 September 2016. It was officially released on September 2, 2016. The song is a cover of Ginny Blackmore's of the same name, released in 2013. The single was produced by Troy Miller and Martin Cheung. On September 3, Ferguson performed the song on the BBC One reality TV show Strictly Come Dancing.

"Superwoman" was released as the 2nd single.

Track listing

Charts

References

2016 albums
Rebecca Ferguson (singer) albums
Syco Music albums
Sony Music albums